Grant Lake, also called Halls Valley Lake, is an artificial lake located in Santa Clara County, California.

See also 
List of dams and reservoirs in California
List of lakes in California
List of lakes in the San Francisco Bay Area

References 

Reservoirs in Santa Clara County, California
Reservoirs in California
Reservoirs in Northern California